Songs for a Healthier America is a 19-track compilation album by various artists, released in 2013 as a collaborative project by the Partnership for a Healthier America, whose honorary chair is First Lady Michelle Obama,  and Hip Hop Public Health. The album encourages children to exercise and make healthy food choices. Guest vocalists include Ashanti, Doug E. Fresh, Monifah, Run DMC and Jordin Sparks; other contributors include Ariana Grande, Blink-182's Travis Barker and Matisyahu, performing as Salad Bar, Nils Lofgren of Bruce Springsteen's E Street Band, and Iman Shumpert.

Track listing

References

2013 compilation albums
Children's music albums
Hip hop compilation albums